Gynanisa maja, the speckled emperor or chipumi, is a moth of the family Saturniidae. The species was first described by Johann Christoph Friedrich Klug in 1836. It is known from South Africa to eastern Africa (up to Angola and Zambia). Gynanisa nigra is just a darker form and not a distinct species.

The wingspan is 105–113 mm. Adults are on wing from late December to early February.

Larvae have been recorded on Acacia erioloba, Acacia karroo, Acacia mollissima, Berlinia paniculata, Brachystegia venosa, Cassia, Colophospermum mopane, Elephantorrhiza burchelli, Julbernardia, Laburnum, Peltophorum, Prunus persica, Pterocarpus, Quercus gambelii, Quercus robur, Quercus turneri, Robinia pseudoacacia and Schotia. Early instar larvae are gregarious. They have a reddish-black colour. As they develop, they become solitary feeders, hiding on the underside of leaf stems and twigs. These later instars are green with silver spines. Fully grown larvae descend from the host plant to pupate in deep underground chambers.

The larvae serve as an important human food source. See Entomophagy.

References

Saturniinae
Moths of Africa
Moths described in 1836
Taxa named by Johann Christoph Friedrich Klug